Usham Deben Singh is an Indian politician and member of the Bharatiya Janata Party. Singh Currently  member of the Manipur Legislative Assembly from the Wabgai constituency in Thoubal district from 2022.

References 

People from Thoubal district
Communist Party of India politicians from Manipur
Manipur MLAs 2007–2012
Living people
Manipur politicians
21st-century Indian politicians
Year of birth missing (living people)
Manipur MLAs 2022–2027
Bharatiya Janata Party politicians from Manipur